Sonam Tshering Lepcha (3 January 1928 – 30 July 2020) was an Indian folk musician, composer and lyricist. He was the first among Lepcha people to air his voice on All India Radio and was credited with the revival of Lepcha culture, one of the indigenous cultures of the Indian state of Sikkim. He was reported to be credited with over 400 folk songs, 102 folk dances and 10 dance dramas. He died on 30 July, 2020 due to cardiac arrest.

Early life 
Sonam Tshering was born on 3 January 1928 in Bong Busty, Kalimpong, West Bengal, and started his career as a soldier.

Career 
Lepcha travelled in Sikkim, collecting traditional musical instruments and compiling songs and became the first Lepcha to feature on All India Radio in 1960. He is the founder of a museum in Kalimpong which houses several ancient and rare artifacts including indigenous musical instruments, ancient weapons and manuscripts. He received the Sangeet Natak Akademi Award of the Sangeet Natak Akademi in 1995. The Government of India awarded him the fourth highest civilian honour of the Padma Shri, in 2007, for contributions to folk music. In 2011, in connection with the 150th Birthday celebrations of Rabindranath Tagore, Sangeet Natak Akademi selected 100 eminent performing artists of the country and Tshering Lepcha was included in the list of 50 for the Tagore Akademi Ratna Award.

See also 
 Lepcha people

References

External links 

Recipients of the Padma Shri in arts
1928 births
2020 deaths
Recipients of the Sangeet Natak Akademi Award
Musicians from West Bengal
Indian folk musicians
Indian male composers
20th-century Indian composers
People from Kalimpong district
20th-century male musicians
Lepcha people
Deaths from the COVID-19 pandemic in India